The Albert Einstein College of Medicine is a private, nonprofit, research-intensive medical school in the Morris Park neighborhood, the Bronx, New York City, United States. Founded in 1953, Einstein operates as an independent degree-granting institution as part of the integrated health care Montefiore Health System (Montefiore Medicine) and also has affiliation with Jacobi Medical Center.

Admission to Einstein is highly competitive, with one of the lowest acceptance rates among medical schools in the United States (3.3% in 2021). Einstein ranks 13th among top U.S. medical schools for graduate success in academic medicine and biomedical research (i.e., awards, publications, grants, and clinical trials), and its NIH funding per investigator consistently ranks among the highest in the nation (7th among US universities in 2019).

Einstein offers a M.D. program, a Ph.D. program in the biomedical sciences and clinical investigation, and two Master of Science (M.S.) degrees. In 2021, the MD program matriculated 183 students from 9,773 applicants. Einstein’s MD program employs a holistic admissions process; the median undergraduate GPA of matriculants is 3.83, and the median MCAT score is in the 93rd percentile.

The Medical Scientist Training Program at Einstein is one of the oldest, largest, and most distinguished MD/PhD programs in the U.S. Einstein was one of the original three MD/PhD programs to be awarded funding from the National Institutes of Health in 1964, and has received continuous funding since then. The program is currently training over 100 MD/PhD students.

The college is named for the world-renowned physicist and humanitarian Albert Einstein.

History

Einstein used to be the medical school of Yeshiva University. Samuel Belkin, then-president of Yeshiva University, began planning a new medical school as early as 1945. Six years later, Belkin and New York City Mayor Vincent Impellitteri entered into an agreement to begin its construction with funding from Henry H. Minskoff and Phillip Stollman. Around the same time, physicist and humanitarian Albert Einstein sent a letter to Belkin. He remarked that such an endeavor would be "unique" in that the school would "welcome students of all creeds and races". Two years later, on his 74th birthday, March 14, 1953, Albert Einstein agreed to have his name attached to the medical school.

The first classes began September 12, 1955, with 56 students. The first dean was Irving London. It was the first new medical school to open in New York City since 1897. The Sue Golding Graduate Division was established in 1957 to offer Doctor of Philosophy degrees in biomedical disciplines. The Medical Scientist Training Program, a combined MD–PhD program, was started 1964. The Clinical Research Training Program, which confers Master of Science degrees in clinical research methods, began in July 1998.

In February 2015, Yeshiva University announced the transfer of ownership of Einstein to the Montefiore Health System, in order to eliminate a large deficit from the university's financial statements. The medical school accounted for approximately two-thirds of the university's annual operating deficits, which had reached about $100 million before the announcement. On September 9, 2015, the agreement between Yeshiva and Montefiore was finalized, and financial and operational control of Albert Einstein College of Medicine was transferred to Montefiore. Yeshiva University continued to grant Einstein's degrees until 2018, as the medical school achieved independent degree-granting authority in the spring of 2019.

Student body 
There are 183 first-year medical students in the Class of 2025. 9,773 people applied for seats, and 1,200 were interviewed. 60% of the class identify as women and 20% identify with groups underrepresented in medicine. Ages range from 21 to 34 with an average age of 23.5. 16% of students were born outside the United States and students come from 17 U.S. states. Students have an excellent track record of volunteer service.

Programs

MD Program 
Admission to Einstein's MD program is highly competitive. In response and to prepare applicants for holistic review that will evaluate, equally, their personal characteristics and academic readiness for medical school, the Albert Einstein College of Medicine has instituted a competency-based admissions process. In other words, applicants are expected to demonstrate a solid foundation in science, but there is no strict requirement on which prerequisite courses must be taken. This "competency-based" approach also provides candidates greater flexibility, for example, by substituting laboratory experience gained, while employed, for laboratory and or course requirements taken in school, or by substituting online courses that free up time to pursue interests that enhance the applicant's level of maturity and readiness for the medical profession.

Medical Scientist Training Program 
Einstein's Medical Scientist Training Program was one of the original three programs funded by the NIH in 1964, and has been funded continuously since then. The program is designed to train investigators who could bridge the gap between basic science and clinical research by providing integrated graduate and clinical training. Einstein's program offers an integrated first-year curriculum covering both graduate and medical coursework. Second-year students complete the second year M.D. curriculum while working to select a Ph.D. thesis advisor. After performing one clinical clerkship, students commence their thesis research while completing any remaining coursework required for their graduate department. Students are expected to publish at least one first author, peer-reviewed paper. On average, students publish two first-author papers and four papers. After defending their dissertation, students complete the required clinical clerkships then have the opportunity to take "fourth-year" electives.  While on dissertation status, students have the opportunity to attend a continuity clinic which ensures they stay in touch with patients and the clinical atmosphere.

Since the first graduating class in 1961, the Graduate Division of Biomedical Sciences has trained over 1600 students, including 400 M.D./Ph.D. students. The average time to complete the degree is 5.8 years, and students produce an average of four peer-reviewed papers and two first-author peer-reviewed papers. Students do not apply to a specific department, but rather to the Ph.D. program as a whole, permitting them to rotate across laboratories and disciplines to make an informed choice regarding their thesis laboratory.

Master's Degree Programs 
The Clinical Research Training Program, founded in 1998, leads to the awarding of the Master of Science in Clinical Research Methods. This program involves spending one year after clerkships and some elective time during the fourth year completing courses in clinical research methods and driving a mentor-guided research project that leads to two first-author manuscripts. This program is offered at no additional cost to medical students and fellowship stipends are available. In addition to medical students, clinical fellows and academic researchers also take part in this training.

In partnership with The Cardozo School of Law, Einstein offers a Master of Science in Bioethics that focuses on transnational work in bioethics to help professionals improve care and communication.

PhD Program in Biomedical Sciences 
Applicants apply directly to the PhD program, not to a specific department. This allows graduate students to gain exposure many areas of research before making an informed decision about the thesis work. There are more than 200 biomedical laboratories for students to choose.

PhD Program In Clinical Investigation 
The Ph.D. concentration in Clinical Investigation provides rigorous advanced training that prepares students for an independent research career in clinical and translational science. It is offered for Ph.D. students enrolled in Einstein’s graduate division and for M.D./Ph.D. students in Einstein’s Medical Scientist Training Program.

Affiliations
Einstein's affiliated hospital networks include Montefiore Health System and Jacobi Medical Center, providing diverse medical settings (e.g., urban and suburban, private and public) for training experiences.

Montefiore Health System 
Einstein's parent institute, Montefiore Health System, is a private healthcare system and one of the largest employers in New York. It comprises 15 member hospitals, including Montefiore Medical Center and Children's Hospital at Montefiore, and more than 200 outpatient ambulatory care sites that provide coordinated, comprehensive care to patients and their families across the Bronx, Westchester and the Hudson Valley.

Jacobi Medical Center 
Jacobi Medical Center, a public hospital adjacent to Einstein, provides health care for some 1.2 million Bronx and New York City area residents.

Centers and institutes

NIH Designated Centers 
 Albert Einstein Cancer Center
 Center for AIDS Research
 Diabetes Research Center
 Harold and Muriel Block Institute for Clinical and Translational Research at Einstein and Montefiore
 Institute for Aging Research
 Marion Bessin Liver Research Center
 New York Regional Center for Diabetes Translation Research
 Rose F. Kennedy Intellectual and Developmental Disabilities Research Center

Centers of Excellence 
 Bronx HOPE
 Center for Epigenomics
 Children's Evaluation and Rehabilitation Center
 Gruss Lipper Biophotonics Center
 Gruss Magnetic Resonance Research Center
 Institute for Onco-Physics
 Integrated Imaging Program
 Ruth L. and David S. Gottesman Institute for Stem Cell and Regenerative Medicine Research
 Wilf Family Cardiovascular Research Institute

Programs of Distinction 
 Center for Comparative Effectiveness Research
 Institute for Brain Disorders and Neural Regeneration
 Resnick Gerontology Center

Einstein Specialty Programs 
 Global Health Center

Achievements

Einstein has supported such medical achievements as:
The world's first coronary artery bypass surgery was performed in the United States on May 2, 1960, at the Albert Einstein College of Medicine-Bronx Municipal Hospital Center by a team led by Robert H. Goetz and the thoracic surgeon, Michael Rohman with the assistance of Jordan Haller and Ronald Dee.
Einstein researchers demonstrated the association between reduced levels of high-density lipoproteins (HDL) cholesterol and heart disease.
Einstein scientists discovered structural abnormalities of brain cells that explain certain forms of intellectual disability.
The Division of Substance Abuse is the largest addiction treatment program in the Bronx.
In 1964, Einstein was the first medical school in the United States to establish a Department of Genetics.
In 1965, Einstein opened one of the first General Clinical Research Centers in the US, funded by the NIH
In 1976, researchers at Einstein identified the mechanism of action of Taxol, a cancer drug.
In 1988, one of the first U.S. Centers for AIDS Research funded by the NIH was created at Einstein.

Housing
Einstein provides housing for students, Postdocs and staff at a reduced rate. Student housing is located on campus in 3 tower blocks at 1925, 1935 and 1945 Eastchester Road. Medical and graduate students are guaranteed student housing for all years of their respective programs. Rent includes free internet and utilities and is significantly cheaper than the market rate in the area. Student housing also offers underground parking, onsite laundry and a recreation center. Apartments offered include one-person studios (470 square feet), two-person apartments (640 square feet) and three-person apartments (975 square feet).

Postdoc housing is located just off campus at 1579 Rhinelander Avenue. Apartments offered include one-person one-bed apartments, two-person one-bed apartments and family-sized apartments. Rent includes free internet and is significantly cheaper than the market rate in the area. Postdoc housing also offers underground parking and onsite laundry.

See also

List of Albert Einstein College of Medicine People
 Medical education in the United States
Montefiore Medical Center

External links

YouTube EDU—Einstein YouTube page.
D. Samuel Gottesman Library—official website.
Montefiore Medical Center—official website.
MD Degree Program – Education Website—educational informatics website.
Einstein Medical Scientist Training Program (MD–PhD)—official website.
GSC—Einstein Graduate Student Council—student-body's resource-rich website.
EPA—Einstein Postdoc Association—Einstein postdoc website.
AECOMmunity—Einstein medical student Website—student-run resource website.
ECHO free clinic

References

Private universities and colleges in New York City
Schools of medicine in New York City
Universities and colleges in New York City
Educational institutions established in 1955
Jewish medical organizations
Universities and colleges in the Bronx
1955 establishments in New York City
Morris Park, Bronx
Montefiore Health System